John Newcombe and Tony Roche successfully defended their title, defeating Tom Okker and Marty Riessen in the final, 7–5, 11–9, 6–3 to win the gentlemen's doubles title at the 1969 Wimbledon Championships.

Seeds

  John Newcombe /  Tony Roche (champions)
  Roy Emerson /  Rod Laver (semifinals)
  Ken Rosewall /  Fred Stolle (third round)
  Bob Lutz /  Stan Smith (quarterfinals)
  Bob Hewitt /  Frew McMillan (semifinals)
  Tom Okker /  Marty Riessen (final)
  Cliff Drysdale /  Roger Taylor (quarterfinals)
  Arthur Ashe /  Charlie Pasarell (third round)

Draw

Finals

Top half

Section 1

Section 2

Bottom half

Section 3

Section 4

References

External links

1969 Wimbledon Championships – Men's draws and results at the International Tennis Federation

Men's Doubles
Wimbledon Championship by year – Men's doubles